England is one of only six teams to have competed in every Commonwealth Games since the first Empire Games in 1930. The others are Australia, Canada, New Zealand, Scotland and Wales.

The Commonwealth Games is the only major multi-sport event in which English athletes and teams compete as England, organised by Commonwealth Games England; at Olympic, Paralympic and European Games England participates as part of Great Britain and Northern Ireland, (along with Scotland, Wales and Northern Ireland, 10 of the 13 British Overseas Territories and the three Crown Dependencies) through the British Olympic Association.

Games summary

Commonwealth Games

After the 2022 Commonwealth Games, England was second in the All-time tally of medals, with an overall total of 2322 medals (773 Gold, 783 Silver and 766 Bronze). Australia has been the highest scoring team for fourteen games, England for seven and Canada for one.

Commonwealth Paraplegic Games

Host nation
England has hosted the Games thrice: 
1934 British Empire Games – London, England
2002 Commonwealth Games – Manchester, England
2022 Commonwealth Games – Birmingham, England

Commonwealth Games England

Commonwealth Games England (CGE) is the organisation responsible for all matters relating to the Commonwealth Games in England. Membership of the Games Council consists of representatives of 26 sports in the Commonwealth Games programme from which the host city selects up to 17 sports for each Games. The officers are elected by the council and hold office for 4 years, their work will be supported by four salaried staff. The current president is Dame Kelly Holmes, who won her first international Gold medal at the 1994 Commonwealth Games, in Victoria, Canada.

CGE is a member of the Commonwealth Games Federation who have overall responsibility for the direction and control of the Commonwealth Games.

How it helps English competitors 
Since 1994, the costs of the preparation of Team England have been supported with funding from Sport England, a public body that distributes public and lottery funds. This has enabled CGE to run extensive management, training and educational programmes, ensuring that competitors and officials alike are fully prepared to meet the challenges ahead.

Funds 
The raising of funds for the team's participation in the Games themselves is the sole responsibility of CGE and is raised through sponsorship and fund-raising activities. Donations from commerce and industry as well as the general public towards the team's costs are always most gratefully received. Without this ongoing support Team England would not be able to participate in the Games.

Team symbols

Brand identity 

In the run-up to the 2010 Commonwealth Games, CGE adopted a new logo and brand identity. The new logo features a single red English lion which represents strength, power and performance. The team strapline is "We are England".

Flag and victory anthem 

Team England uses the Cross of St George as its flag at the Commonwealth Games. This flag is common for all sporting teams that represent England as an entity distinct from the United Kingdom.

Since 2010 onwards, Team England have used the hymn "Jerusalem" as their victory anthem. This replaced "Land of Hope and Glory" which was used at previous games. In April 2010, Commonwealth Games England conducted a poll of members of the public which would decide the anthem for the 2010 Games. The three options were "God Save The Queen", "Jerusalem" and "Land of Hope and Glory" with "Jerusalem" being the clear winner securing 52% of the vote.

References

External links

 

 
Sports organisations of England
1930 establishments in England